Nematostylis is a monotypic genus of flowering plants in the family Rubiaceae. The genus contains only one species, i.e. Nematostylis anthophylla, which is endemic to Madagascar.

Taxonomy
The genus was described by Joseph Dalton Hooker in 1873 and only held the species Nematostylis loranthoides. This species was made synonym with Nematostylis anthophylla, which then became the type species.

References

External links
World Checklist of Rubiaceae

Monotypic Rubiaceae genera
Alberteae
Taxa named by Henri Ernest Baillon
Taxa named by Alphonse Pyramus de Candolle
Taxa named by Achille Richard